The 11th Sikh Regiment was an infantry regiment of the British Indian Army. They could trace their origins to 1922, when after World War I the Indian government reformed the army moving from single battalion regiments to multi battalion regiments.
The regiment was formed from the:
 1st Battalion – 14th King George's Own Ferozepore Sikhs
 2nd Battalion – 15th Ludhiana Sikhs
 3rd Battalion – 45th Rattray's Sikhs
 4th Battalion  – 36th Sikhs
 5th Battalion – 47th Sikhs
 10th Training Battalion – 35th Sikhs

During World War II a further seven infantry battalions were formed the 6th, 7th, 8th, 9th, 14th, 25th and a machine gun battalion. The 8th and 9th battalions were converted to Light Anti-Aircraft battalions.

The regiment was allocated to the new Indian Army on independence and became the Sikh Regiment.

Bibliography

References 

British Indian Army infantry regiments
Indian World War II regiments
Military units and formations established in 1922
R
R